Pontus is a masculine given name of Swedish origin. The name arose in Sweden through French nobleman Pontus De la Gardie: named Ponce in French, he transliterated his name that way rather than the standard Pontius. It was a relatively uncommon given name in Sweden, but came into greater usage there in the 1980s and 1990s. The name day for Pontus in Sweden is 20 November.

List of people 

 Pontus Åberg (born 1993), Swedish ice hockey player
 Pontus Åhman (born 1994), Swedish rally driver
 Pontus Almqvist (born 1999), Swedish footballer
  (born 1992), Swedish politician
 Pontus Andersson, Swedish guitarist for Dia Psalma
 Pontus Andreasson (born 1998), Swedish ice hockey player
 Pontus Artti (1878–1936), Finnish diplomat and writer
 Pontus Åsbrink (born 1992), Swedish footballer
 Pontus Aspgren (born 1991), Swedish speedway rider
  (born 1979), Swedish musician
  (born 1964), Swedish economist
  (born 1967), Swedish businessman
  (born 1954), Swedish businessman
 Pontus Braunerhjelm (born 1953), Swedish economist
 Pontus Brevern-de la Gardie (1814–1890), Swedish nobleman
  (1835–1905), Swedish landowner and politician
 Pontus Carle (born 1955), Swedish artist
 Pontus Carlsson (born 1982), Swedish chess player
 Pontus Dahlberg (born 1999), Swedish footballer
  (1812–1882), Finnish statesman
  (born 1967), Swedish comedian and clothing designer
 Pontus Egberg, Swedish bassist for The Poodles
 Pontus Ek (born 1975), Swedish rower
  (born 1982), Swedish radio host
 Pontus Ekhem (born 1991), Swedish ice hockey player
 Pontus Eklöf (born 1998), Swedish ice hockey player
  (born 1958), Swedish radio host and comedian
 Pontus Engblom (born 1991), Swedish footballer
  (1850–1923), Swedish historian and political scientist
 Pontus Farnerud (born 1980), Swedish footballer
  (born 1988), Swedish swimmer
  (born 1966), Swedish car designer
  (born 1997), Swedish racing driver
  (born 1979), Swedish music producer
  (born 1972), Swedish chef and restaurateur
 Pontus Fürstenberg (1827–1902), Swedish art collector and merchant
 Pontus De la Gardie (1520–1585), Swedish nobleman and general
  (1726–91), Swedish nobleman
 Pontus Gårdinger (born 1964), Swedish television host
  (1922–2018), Swedish art historian
 Pontus Gustafsson (born 1955), Swedish actor
  (born 1983), Swedish politician
  (born 1965), Swedish museum director
 Pontus Hanson (1894–1962), Swedish swimmer and water polo player
  (1852–1933), Swedish engineer and textbook author
  (1535–1602), Dutch historian
  (born 1990), Swedish footballer
  (born 1970), Swedish child actor
 Pontus Holmberg (born 1999), Swedish ice hockey player
  (born 1964), Swedish musician
 Pontus Hultén (1924–2006), Swedish art collector and museum director
 Pontus Jansson (born 1991), Swedish footballer
 Pontus Jäntti (born 1968), Finnish badminton player
 Pontus Johansson (born 1991), Swedish ice hockey player
  (born 1970), Swedish professor
 Pontus Kåmark (born 1969), Swedish footballer
 Pontus Karlsson (born 1983), Swedish footballer
  (born 1995), Swedish cyclist
  (born 1954), Swedish-Danish artist and art educator
  (born 1959), Finnish art historian
  (1880–1944), Swedish painter
  (1872–1935), Swedish orientalist and professor
 Pontus Karl Johan Lidberg (born 1977), Swedish choreographer and dancer
  (born 1965), Swedish civil engineer
  (born 1945), Swedish artist and architect
  (born 1990), Swedish wrestler
  (born 1971), Swedish cartoonist, film maker and musician
  (born 1965), Swedish journalist
  (born 1990), Swedish handball player
 Pontus Molander (born 1964), Swedish ice hockey player
  (1921–2009), Swedish genealogist
  (born 1984), Swedish-Italian ice hockey player and coach
 Pontus Netterberg (born 1992), Swedish ice hockey player
  (born 1982), Swedish track and field sprinter
 Pontus Norgren (born 1968), Swedish power metal guitarist
 Pontus Nyholm (born 1998), Swedish golfer
  (born 1987), Swedish actor
  (1907–1993), Finnish ornithologist
  (1823–1855), Estonian clergyman
 Pontus Petterström (born 1982), Swedish ice hockey player
  (born 1954), Swedish artist
  (born 1971), Swedish actor and director
  (born 1987), Finnish writer
  (1872–1918), Swedish tennis player
 Pontus Renholm (born 1986), Swedish swimmer
  (1871–1949), Swedish military officer
 Pontus Rödin (born 2000), Swedish footballer
  (1875–1952), Swedish jurist and politician
 Pontus Schultz (1972–2012), Swedish journalist and businessman
 Pontus Segerström (1981–2014), Swedish footballer
  (1951–2020), Swedish medic and professor
 Pontus Själin (born 1996), Swedish ice hockey player
  (180–1929), Swedish librarian
 Pontus Sjögren (born 1985), Swedish ice hockey player
  (born 1971), Swedish film producer
 Pontus Silfwer (born 1991), Swedish footballer
 Pontus Skoglund (born 1984), Swedish geneticist
  (18971971), Swedish editor and playwright (born Helmer Jarl Wahlroos)
 Pontus Ståhlkloo (born 1973), Swedish snowboarder
  (born 1966), Swedish theatre director and actor
  (born 1970), Swedish actor and director
  (1886–1962), Swedish painter
  (born 1987), Swedish javelin thrower
 Pontus Tidemand (1990), Swedish rally driver
  (born 1957), Swedish painter and writer
 Pontus de Tyard (1512–1605), French poet and priest
 Pontus von Rosen (1881–1951), Swedish fencer
 Pontus Wernbloom (born 1986), Swedish footballer
 Pontus Widén (1920–1983), Swedish bandy player and sports executive
 Pontus Wikner (1837–1888), Swedish lecturer
  (born 1994), Swedish handball player

Middle name
 Carl Pontus Gahn (1759–1825), Swedish military officer
  (1758–1820), Swedish soldier
 Christian-Pontus Andersson (born 1977), Swedish artist
  (1802–1878), Swedish mill owner and politician
  (1839–1915), Swedish soldier and artist
  (1878–1952), Swedish priest and psalm writer
  (1744–1824), Swedish nobleman and military officer
 Klas Pontus Arnoldson (1844–1916), Swedish author, journalist, and politician

See also

 Pontus (disambiguation)
 Pontius (disambiguation)

References

Swedish masculine given names
Finnish masculine given names
Lists of people by given name